Laksana Tri Handoko (born 7 May 1968, in Malang) is an Indonesian scientist and public official specializing in theoretical and particle physics. He formerly served as the deputy head of science and technology for the Indonesian Institute of Sciences (Indonesian: Lembaga Ilmu Pengetahuan Indonesia, LIPI) from 2014 to 2018. In 2018, he replaced Bambang Subiyanto as the acting chairman of the institute.

He appointed as Chairman of National Research and Innovation Agency (Indonesian: Badan Riset dan Inovasi Nasional, BRIN) since 28 April 2021.

Early life and education 
Handoko born to Suyono and Susasi. His father was a physics lecturer at Gadjah Mada University and part-time chicken farmer, and her mother was a chicken farmer. At that period, physics was deemed as field that not too much earning due to limited opportunity and salary in Indonesia at that time, resulting his father to have side job as chicken farmer despite his post. Through the chicken farming, his parents educated him professionalism and hardworking early in his youth. 

Despite his background, Handoko love physics and his love to physics bring him to Bandung Institute of Technology for undergraduate study in physics. However, when Habibie open Overseas Fellowship Program scholarship opened, he registered on it and later accepted to the scholarship and resigned from Bandung Institute of Technology. He completed his undergraduate study at Kumamoto University, and then his graduate study in particle physics at Hiroshima University. 

Between his time of undergraduate graduation and master study, he was worked to a Japanese wood factory and later become a gas station employee in Japan.

He became a fellow of the Alexander von Humboldt Foundation in 1999, and he's also the secretary of the Humboldt Alumni association of Indonesia.

Careers

LIPI Scientist 
After returned to Indonesia, Handoko joined LIPI. In LIPI, he joined Theoretical Physics group. In 2002, he later become Head of LIPI Theoretical Physics Group, a post he hold for 10 years. In 2012, he become Head of LIPI Research Center for Informatics. He rose to rank of Deputy of Deputy III (Engineering Sciences) of LIPI in 2014 until 2018.

Educator 
During this time as LIPI scientist, he appointed visiting professor of Department of Physics Bogor Agricultural Institute (2002-2004) and Department of Physics University of Indonesia (since 2002). At the time of his appointment as Chairman of BRIN, he still holding the visiting professor position at University of Indonesia.

Chairman of LIPI 
He become 10th Chairman of LIPI in 2018, succeeded Iskandar Zulkarnaen, the 9th Chairman of LIPI. Previously, the post was filled in acting capacity by Bambang Subiyanto in transition period between Zulkarnaen to Handoko. He was the penultimate chairman of LIPI.

Chairman of BRIN 
On the second reshuffle of the Onward Indonesia cabinet announced at 28 April 2021, he appointed as the second (but first independent) holder of Chairman of BRIN. After liquidation of Indonesian Institute of Sciences (Indonesian: Lembaga Ilmu Pengetahuan Indonesia, LIPI), Agency for the Assessment and Application of Technology (Indonesian: Badan Pengkajian dan Penerapan Teknologi, BPPT), National Nuclear Energy Agency of Indonesia (Indonesian: Badan Tenaga Nuklir Nasional, BATAN), and National Institute of Aeronautics and Space (Indonesian: Lembaga Penerbangan dan Antariksa Nasional, LAPAN) into BRIN on 1 September 2021, he currently become the Head of BRIN in its first consolidated form.

Honors and awards

Scholarships and Fellowships 

 Overseas Fellowship Program Scholarship, Batch IV, Ministry of Research and Technology (1987-1993)
 Science and Technology for Industrial Development Scholarship, Batch II, Ministry of Research and Technology (1993-1995)
 Monbusho Scholarship, Ministry of Education, Culture, Sports, Science and Technology (1995-1998)
 Postdoctoral Fellowship of the Alexander von Humboldt Stiftung (1998-2001)
 Postdoctoral Fellowship of the Deutsch Electronen Synchroton Stiftung (2000-2001)
 Postdoctoral Fellowship of the ASEAN-KOSEF project at Yonsei University (2003)
 Simons Regular Associate of International Centre for Theoretical Physics (2014-2019)

Awards 
As LIPI scientist, he was awarded by:

 Adidharma Profession Award, Indonesian Engineer Association (2010)
 New Inventions That Are Beneficial to the Country Award, Indonesian Institute of Sciences (2010)
 The 400 most highly cited papers of All Time in the field of High Energy Physics - Phenomenology (2009)
 Outstanding Intellectual Property Award 2009 for Science in the sub-category of Computer, Ministry of Education and Culture (2009)
 101 Most Prospective Innovation 2009.
 Satyalancana Wira Karya (2009)
 Nominee Finalist of Research and Development Category, INAICTA 2009, Department of Communication and Information Technology (2009)
 Achmad Bakrie Award for Science (2008)
 Recognition Award of the e-Government and Services Category, APICTA Indonesia 2006, Indonesian Institute of Sciences (2006)
 Habibie Award of Basic Science (2004), Ministry of Research and Technology
 Winner of the Best Research and Development Category, APICTA Indonesia 2004, Indonesian Institute of Sciences (2004)
 Winner of the Best Education and Training Category, APICTA Indonesia 2004, Indonesian Institute of Sciences (2003)
 Young Indonesian Scientist Award, in the field of Natural and Environmental Science (2002)

As Chairman of BRIN, he was awarded The Chinese Government's Friendship Award by Government of China. In his citation, he is credited with organizing collaborations in the field of nuclear and space research between Indonesia and China. The award presented by Chinese Ambassador to Indonesia, Lu Kang on 26 April 2022.

Controversies 
As Chairman of LIPI, he was seen as "revolutionary" by implementing revolutionary policies to LIPI reorganization. The most important revolutionary policies during his time were reorganization of LIPI, which at time the size is very big due to having many non-optimal subunits into slimmer organization and archiving revolution. Due to his revolutionary policies, he was protested by his seniors at LIPI.

His leadership style as leader of BRIN seen as "one man show leadership" and lack of compromising criticized and protested by his seniors and former colleagues. He was also become the center of polemic due to human resource issue resulted on Eijkman Institute of Molecular Biology liquidation in early 2022.

References 

Hiroshima University alumni
Academic staff of the Indonesian Institute of Sciences
Indonesian physicists
1968 births
Living people
People from Malang